The Victoria Cross (VC) was awarded to 182 members of the British Armed Forces, British Indian Army and civilians under their command, during the Indian Mutiny (also known as the Indian Rebellion of 1857). The VC is a military decoration awarded for valour "in the face of the enemy" to members of armed forces of some Commonwealth countries and previous British Empire territories. It takes precedence over all other Orders, decorations and medals. It may be awarded to a person of any rank in any service and to civilians under military command. The VC is traditionally presented to the recipient by the British monarch during an investiture at Buckingham Palace, though in a large number of cases this was not possible and it was presented in the field by a prominent civil or military official. The VC was introduced in Great Britain on 29 January 1856 by Queen Victoria to reward acts of valour during the Crimean War.

The Indian Mutiny (also known as India's First War of Independence, Revolt of 1857, or the Sepoy Mutiny) began as a mutiny of sepoys of British East India Company's army on 10 May 1857, in the town of Meerut. It soon erupted into other mutinies and civilian rebellions largely in the upper Gangetic plain and central India, with the major hostilities confined to present-day Uttar Pradesh, Bihar, northern Madhya Pradesh, and the Delhi region. The rebellion posed a considerable threat to Company power in that region, and it was contained only with the fall of Gwalior on 20 June 1858. The rebellion proved to be an important watershed in Indian history; it led to the dissolution of the East India Company in 1858, and forced the British to reorganise the army, the financial system, and the administration in India. India was thereafter governed directly from London—by the British government India Office and a cabinet level Secretary of State for India—in the new British Raj, a system of governance that lasted until 1947.

Indian troops were not originally eligible for the VC, because since 1837 they had been eligible for the Indian Order of Merit—the oldest British gallantry award for general issue. When the VC was created, Indian troops were still controlled by the Honourable East India Company, and did not come under Crown control until 1860. European officers and men serving with the Honourable East India Company were not eligible for the Indian Order of Merit; the VC was extended to cover them in October 1857. The first citations of the VC varied in the details of each action; some specify one date, some date ranges, some the name of the battle and others have both sets of information.  The Indian Mutiny holds the record for the most VCs won in a single day; 24 on 16 November 1857, of which 23 were at the Second Relief of Lucknow and one was for an action south of Delhi.

The original royal warrant did not contain a specific clause regarding posthumous awards, although official policy was not to award the VC posthumously. Between the Indian Mutiny in 1857 and the beginning of the Second Boer War, the names of six officers and men were published in the London Gazette with a memorandum stating they would have been awarded the Victoria Cross had they survived. A further three notices were published in the London Gazette in September 1900 and April 1901 for gallantry in the Second Boer War. In an exception to policy for the Second Boer War, six posthumous Victoria Crosses, three to those mentioned in the notices in 1900 and 1901 and a further three, were granted on 8 August 1902, the first official posthumous awards. Five years later in 1907, the posthumous policy was reversed for earlier wars, and medals were sent to the next of kin of the six officers and men whose names were mentioned in notices in the Gazette dating back to the Indian Mutiny. The Victoria Cross warrant was not amended to explicitly allow posthumous awards until 1920, but one quarter of all awards for World War I were posthumous.

Recipients

References 
General

Specific

Indian Mutiny